Espartinas is a city located in the province of Seville, Spain. According to the 2019 census (INE), the city has a population of 15791 inhabitants. It is twinned with Clackmannanshire in Scotland.

History
The origin of Espartinas can be traced back to the Roman era and the establishment
of the settlements of Lauretum, Tablante, Paterna, Villalvilla, and Mejina. The name Espartinas appears in the 13th century,
when king Ferdinand III of Castile conquered vasts areas of the Guadalquivir basin during the
Reconquista. King Alfonso X of Castile later gave the town its current coat of arms.

References

External links
Espartinas - Sistema de Información Multiterritorial de Andalucía

Municipalities of the Province of Seville